Ralph Ingersoll may refer to:
 Ralph Isaacs Ingersoll (1789–1872), United States Representative from Connecticut
 Ralph Ingersoll (PM publisher) (1900–1985), founder and publisher of the short-lived 1940s daily newspaper PM
 Ralph M. Ingersoll Jr., American newspaper publisher